Željko Turk (born 25 March 1962 in Zagreb) is the  mayor of Zaprešić, a town in Zagreb County, Croatia.

Business career 
Turk began his working career in Regeneracija factory, in town of Zabok. In 1991 he founded his own private company centered around textile production and trade.

Political career 
He became the mayor in 2006. He is affiliated with the Croatian Democratic Union (HDZ). He earned a seat in the Croatian Parliament at the 2007 elections and, as of January 11, 2008, constitutes a part of the sixth assembly of the Croatian Parliament. As the mayor of Zaprešić, Turk serves as the president of the Association of Cities. In 2017 local elections, Turk won another mandate over Danijel Saić of SDP. In 2021, Turk was re-elected as mayor of Zaprešić for the fifth time after beating Barbara Knežević of Homeland Movement in second round of local elections, which made him one of the longest serving mayors in Croatia.

Policies 
Under Turk in 2016, Zaprešić was a city with largest public transport subventions in the country. In 2017, Turk stated that he is neutral in regard to proposed legislation which would limit of mandates of mayors and county prefects, saying that the proposed legislation has both positive and negative aspects. In 2018 Turk introduced parking fees in Zaprešić, which united entire political opposition against him and sparked some protests in Zaprešić.

Personal life 
Turk graduated at the Faculty of Economics and Business of the University of Zagreb.

References

1962 births
Living people
Faculty of Economics and Business, University of Zagreb alumni
Politicians from Zagreb
Mayors of places in Croatia
People from Zaprešić
Croatian Democratic Union politicians
Representatives in the modern Croatian Parliament